Alienability may refer to or be associated with:

Alienability (grammar)
Alienability of rights

See also
Alienation (disambiguation)